Craig Harrison may refer to:
Craig Harrison (British Army soldier) (born 1975), British Army sniper
Craig Harrison (footballer) (born 1977), English football defender
Craig Harrison (writer) (born 1942), lecturer, author, playwright and scriptwriter
Craig Harrison (Neighbours), fictional character on the Australian soap opera Neighbours